Red Hicks Defies the World is a 1913 American short comedy film featuring Harry Carey.

Cast

 Charles Murray - Red Hicks
 Edward Dillon - O'Shea, the Fighting Irishman
 Dorothy Gish - Hicks' Sweetheart
 Kate Toncray - Hick's Mother
 Bud Duncan - Hick's Trainer
 William J. Butler - First Creditor
 Adolph Lestina - Second Creditor
 Lionel Barrymore - The Referee
 Gertrude Bambrick - In Crowd
 William Beaudine - In Ring
 Harry Carey - In Crowd
 John T. Dillon - In Crowd
 Frank Evans - In Crowd
 Charles Gorman - In Crowd
 Harry Hyde - In Crowd
 J. Jiquel Lanoe - In Crowd
 Charles Hill Mailes - In Crowd
 Joseph McDermott - In Crowd
 Walter Miller - In Crowd
 Frank Opperman - In Crowd
 Alfred Paget - In Crowd
 Henry B. Walthall - In Crowd
 Charles West - In Crowd

See also
 Harry Carey filmography
 Lionel Barrymore filmography

References

External links

1913 films
1913 comedy films
1913 short films
American silent short films
American black-and-white films
Silent American comedy films
American comedy short films
Films directed by Dell Henderson
1910s American films